War of the Wizards is the fourth and final book in the World of Lone Wolf book series created by Joe Dever and written by Ian Page.  It is one of four books in the mini-series and features Grey Star, for whom the first book is named, a young Wizard trained by the enigmatic Shianti to stop the Wytch-King and his Shadakine Empire. All four of the Grey Star books were released by Project Aon along with many of the other installments of the Lone Wolf series.

Gameplay
The gameplay of the World of Lone Wolf series is very much like the other Lone Wolf books, but features a few key differences. One is the inclusion of Willpower, which can be used for various Magical effects in the game, and maybe most importantly to loose a blast of Magic from your Wizards Staff when it is in your possession. The ability to vanquish some enemies with the expenditure of a Willpower point or two introduces a key strategic consideration in which the reader must choose between the likely loss of Endurance that comes with fighting enemies, and the amount of Willpower that should be saved for later in the story.

Plot
In this, the final installment of the World of Lone Wolf, Grey Star and Tanith have just completed a harrowing quest in the Shadow realm of the Daziarn. Upon retrieving the Moonstone, the two return to Magnamund to find the forces of good and evil poised on the brink of final conflict. Shasarak has enlisted the aid of the dreaded demon lord Agarash the Damned in order to eradicate the resistance movement once and for all. Battling their way through hordes of demons and undead minion, Grey Star and Tanith must struggle to rejoin the Freedom Guild, defeat the forces of the Wytch-King, and fulfill his destiny and promise to the Shianti.

External links
Project Aon - War of the Wizards
Gamebooks - War of the Wizards

Lone Wolf (gamebooks)
1986 fiction books
Berkley Books books